The M73 is a motorway in Glasgow and North Lanarkshire, Scotland. The short stretch between junctions 1 and 2 is part of unsigned international E-road network E05, where it continues along the M8 through Glasgow. To the south, the M74 motorway is also part of the E05.

Route

Starting at the M74 junction 4 (M73 junction 1) by the River Clyde, it proceeds north with Birkenshaw to the east and crosses the Whifflet railway line before meeting the M8 and A8 at a three-level interchange, west of Swinton. Immediately afterwards the North Clyde railway line and then passes alongside Woodend Loch before reaching junction 2A at Gartcosh.  There is then a further  of motorway, before traffic exits onto the M80 westbound.

The road is a dual three-lane road between junctions 1 and 2, and a dual two-lane road between junctions 2 and 3. It is subject to the national speed limit.

History and future plans
Construction began in 1969 with the motorway opening between May 1971 and April 1972. Junction 2A was added at a later date.

In 2011, the northern end was extended as part of the M80 completion project. This connects the motorway into the completed M80 at a new interchange. Further work in 2017 improved access from the M74 at Junction 3A, and from the M8 and A8 at Baillieston Interchange.

Junctions

{| class="plainrowheaders wikitable"
|-
!scope=col|County
!scope=col|Location
!scope=col|mi
!scope=col|km
!scope=col|Junction
!scope=col|Destinations
!scope=col|Notes
|-
|North Lanarkshire
| rowspan="4" |Glasgow
|0
|0
|1
| – Carlisle, Glasgow
|
|-
|Glasgow
|1.5
|2.4
| bgcolor="ffdddd" |2
| bgcolor="ffdddd" | – Edinburgh, Glasgow – Barlanark,  – Gallowgate, Coatbridge
| bgcolor="ffdddd" |No Northbound entrance from West on M8
|-
| rowspan="2" |North Lanarkshire
|4.2
|6.8
|2a
| – Gartcosh, Muirhead
|
|-
|6.4
|10.3
| bgcolor="ffdddd" |3
| bgcolor="ffdddd" | – Stirling – Moodiesburn, Chryston
| bgcolor="ffdddd" |No exit to M80 going Westward or entrance from M80 from the West

Coordinate list

Gallery

See also
List of motorways in the United Kingdom
M80 Motorway – Completion Project

References

External links

Glasgow Motorway Archive – The M73 Motorway
The Motorway Archive – M73

Motorways in Scotland
Transport in North Lanarkshire
Baillieston
Transport in Glasgow